No. 1 Wing AAC is a former Wing of the British Army's Army Air Corps which was based in West Germany in support of the British Army of the Rhine.

Structure

1958-1961 | Detmold 
 652 Squadron at Detmold(1+9).
 654 Squadron at Hildesheim (4+5).
 12 Flight (BAOR HQ Flight) at Wildenrath.
1961-1964 | Detmold 
 652 Squadron at Detmold (1&9).
 654 Squadron at Hildesheim (4+5).
 655 Squadron at Detmold (23+24).
 12 Flight (BAOR HQ Flight) at Wildenrath.
1964-1970 | Detmold 
 12 Flight (BAOR HQ Flight) at Wildenrath.
 18 Flight (HQ 1 Corps Flight) at Detmold.
1971-1976 | Detmold 
 669 Squadron at Wildenrath.
 9 Regiment | Detmold
 655 Squadron at Detmold.
 669 Squadron at Detmold.
1989

 1 Regiment | Tofrek Barracks (Tofrek East) (Hildesheim) - Formerly at Detmold.
 651 Squadron
 652 Squadron
 3 Regiment | Salamanca Barracks (Soest)
 653 Squadron
 662 Squadron
 663 Squadron
 4 Regiment | Hobart Barracks (Detmold)
 654 Squadron
 659 Squadron

See also

 List of Army Air Corps aircraft units

References

Citations

Bibliography

Aviation units and formations of the British Army
Military units and formations established in 1958
Military units and formations disestablished in 1989
1958 establishments in the United Kingdom